Bluff Island is an island of the Andaman Islands. It belongs to the North and Middle Andaman administrative district, part of the Indian union territory of Andaman and Nicobar Islands.

Geography
The island belongs to the West Baratang Group and lies south of Spike Island. The island is separated from South Andaman to the south by narrow channel, 500 m wide. It is 30 metres high to the tops of the trees.

Administration
Politically, Bluff Island, along neighboring Baratang Islands, is part of Rangat Taluk.

Demographics 
The island was previously inhabited.
In 1949, the few surviving Great Andamanese people were relocated to this island to protect them from diseases and other threats. On this island their population reached the all-time low of 19 individuals in 1961. In 1969 they were relocated to the slightly larger Strait Island.

Fauna
Bluff island and the surrounding waters are a wildlife sanctuary of India, initiated in 1987 as a nature preserve. with an area of 1.14 km2.

References 

 Geological Survey of India

Islands of North and Middle Andaman district
Tourist attractions in the Andaman and Nicobar Islands
Uninhabited islands of India
Islands of the Bay of Bengal